Ivatsevichy is a city in Brest Region, Belarus, and the administrative center of Ivatsevichy District.

Sports

Belarusian football club FC Ivatsevichi was based in here in 2018

World War II
Within the Grand Duchy of Lithuania, Ivatsevitshy was part of Nowogródek Voivodeship. In 1795, the town was acquired by the Russian Empire in the course of the Third Partition of Poland

From  1921 until 1939, Ivatsevichy (Iwacewicze) was a provincial city in the Second Polish Republic, the seat of Kosów county with the population of around 1,500. It belonged to Polesie Voivodeship region of eastern Kresy, with a notable Jewish population.

In September 1939, Ivatsevichy was occupied by the Red Army and, on 14 November 1939, incorporated into the Byelorussian SSR. Following the Invasion of Poland, the number of Jews in Ivatsevichy greatly increased due to influx of refugees from the Nazi-occupied western part of Poland.

Ivatsevichy was occupied by Nazi Germany from 24 June 1941 until 12 July 1944 and administered as a part of the Generalbezirk Weißruthenien of Reichskommissariat Ostland. The Nazis carried out mass executions of Jews at the Żwirownia gravel pit nearby. Under a strong German guard, Jews were marched out of town and separated into smaller groups. They were shot in waves over the already dug-out pits. Before 1944, the Nazis executed there more than a thousand innocent victims including prisoners of war. In 1941 soon after the Nazi takeover of Ivatsevichy, a ghetto was set up for about 600 Jews. They were fed starvation rations and forced to perform slave labor. On 14 March 1942 the ghetto was liquidated. All inmates were marched on foot to the Słonim Ghetto, and over the course of several months murdered there.

After the liberation, in Soviet Belarus the area of the mass graves in Ivatsevichy was used to extract sand. During mining, the bones of the dead were constantly being unearthed, until finally in the 1960s, a stone memorial was placed at the pits, marking the already mined graves.

References

External links
 Portal of Ivatsevichy District 
 Ivatsevichy City Forum
 Photos on Radzima.org

Cities in Belarus
Grodno Governorate
Holocaust locations in Belarus
Ivatsevichy District
Nowogródek Voivodeship (1507–1795)
Polesie Voivodeship
Populated places in Brest Region